David Serero may refer to:
 David Serero (architect)
 David Serero (singer)